You Can't Take It with You is a comedic play in three acts by George S. Kaufman and Moss Hart.  The original production of the play premiered on Broadway in 1936, and played for 838 performances.

The play won the 1937 Pulitzer Prize for Drama, and was adapted for the screen as You Can't Take It with You in 1938, which won the Academy Award for Best Picture and Best Director.

The play is popular among theater programs of high school institutions, and has been one of the 10 most-produced school plays every year since amateur rights became available in 1939.

Plot

Act One 

The story takes place entirely in the large house of a slightly odd New York City family. Various characters in the lives of the Vanderhof-Sycamore-Carmichael clan are introduced in the first act.

The patriarch of the family, Grandpa Vanderhof, is a whimsical old man who keeps snakes and has never paid his income tax. Penelope "Penny" Vanderhof Sycamore is his daughter (a writer of adventure- and sex-filled melodrama plays), and is married to Paul Sycamore, a tinkerer who manufactures fireworks in the basement with the help of his assistant, Mr. De Pinna, who used to be the family's iceman. One of Paul and Penny's two daughters is Essie Sycamore Carmichael, a childish candy maker who dreams of being a ballerina (but in reality is terrible at dancing). Essie is married to Ed Carmichael, a xylophone player who lives with them and helps distribute Essie's candies. Ed is an amateur printer who prints any phrase that sounds catchy. Paul and Penny's other daughter Alice Sycamore is quite obviously the only "normal" family member. She has an office job and is sometimes embarrassed by the eccentricities of her family, yet deep down, she still loves them. In addition, the Vanderhof-Sycamore-Carmichael clan employs a maid, Rheba, who is dating Donald, a handyman who performs odd jobs for the Sycamores.

Essie tells Grandpa Vanderhof that some letters have arrived for him from the "United States Government", but that she misplaced them. Shortly afterwards, Alice comes home and announces that she has fallen in love with a young man with whom she works, Tony Kirby, the son of the company's executive. Before going upstairs to change, Alice tells her family that he will be coming over shortly to take her on a date. The entire family is still joyfully discussing her boyfriend when the doorbell rings. Penny answers the door and greets the man standing there, thinking he must be Tony, but only after forcing the stranger to shake hands with the entire family do they realize that he is not Alice's boyfriend: He is a tax investigator.

His name is Wilbur C. Henderson, and he is investigating Grandpa for his evasion of income tax. When Henderson asks Grandpa why he owed twenty-four years of back income tax, Grandpa states he never believed in it, and that the government wouldn't know what to do with the money if he did pay it. Henderson becomes infuriated by Grandpa's answers to his questions. Henderson spots Grandpa's snakes, and runs out of the house in fear, but not before promising Grandpa that he will hear – one way or another – from the United States government.

The real Tony Kirby arrives, and Alice is nervous that her eccentric family will scare him away, so she attempts to leave with him on their date. As they attempt to leave, Mr. Boris Kolenkhov, Essie's extremely eccentric Russian ballet instructor, arrives and makes chitchat with the family, complaining about the Revolution. During this discussion, Alice and Tony make their escape.  Then the rest of the family sit down for dinner.

Act Two 
The second act takes place several days later. Alice has invited Tony and his father and mother over for dinner the next evening, and it is the only thing on the entire family's mind. Alice runs around the house telling her family to try to act as normal as possible. Penny has brought actress Gay Wellington over to read over Penny's latest play, but Gay becomes very drunk, and passes out onto the living room couch after looking at the snakes.

Ed returns from distributing Essie's candies, worried that he is being followed by someone. When Mr. De Pinna looks out the window, he sees no one other than a man walking away. Ed is still sent out by Essie to deliver more candies. Paul and Mr. De Pinna are downstairs the whole time making fireworks. Mr. De Pinna comes up from the basement carrying a painting that Penny had started of him as a discus thrower. Mr. De Pinna asks if Penny would finish it and she agrees. She leaves to put on her painting gear and Mr. De Pinna leaves to put on his costume.

At the same time, Mr. Kolenkhov arrives and begins Essie's ballet lesson. Ed provides accompanying music on the xylophone. Rheba runs in and out of the kitchen cleaning. Grandpa takes this time to practice darts and feed the snakes. In the midst of all this hullabaloo, Tony appears in the doorway with Mr. Kirby and Mrs. Kirby. Before them is the entire eccentric spectacle. Apparently, Tony has forgotten for which night dinner was planned, and Alice is incredibly embarrassed.

Penny tells Alice not to worry, and that they can manage a nice dinner easily. She gives a list of things to Donald and tells him to run down to the store. Grandpa tries desperately to keep the party normal and under control for the sake of his granddaughter. Mr. Kirby reveals himself to be a very straitlaced fat-cat, who raises orchids as a hobby. Mr. Kirby investigates a child's model and finds it is Paul's "hobby". Mrs. Kirby tells them that her true passion is spiritualism, which Penny derides as a "fake". During a discussion of hobbies, Mr. Kolenkhov brings up that the Romans' hobby was wrestling, and demonstrates on Mr. Kirby by throwing him on the floor.

To pass the time after this awkward incident, Penny suggests they play a free association game. Alice imagines what is coming and immediately tries to quash the suggestions, but Penny shrugs her off and instructs everyone to write down "the first thing that pops into their heads" after she says certain words.

Penny offers the words "potato", "bathroom", "lust", "honeymoon", and "sex". Penny reads Mr. Kirby's list first, with reactions of, respectively: "steak", "toothpaste", "unlawful", "trip", and "male". Mrs. Kirby's list, however, causes much controversy. "Starch" is her response to potatoes, which is not that bad, but her response for "bathroom" is "Mr. Kirby", and she covers it up with the fact that Mr. Kirby spends a lot of time in there "bathing and shaving". Her response to "lust" is "human", claiming it is a perfectly human emotion. Mr. Kirby disagrees, saying "it is depraved". "Honeymoon"'s reply is "dull", as Mrs. Kirby explains that there was "nothing to do at night". The shocker comes when Mrs. Kirby says her reply to "sex" was "Wall Street". She at first claims she doesn't know what she meant by it, but once provoked she yells at Mr. Kirby "You're always talking about Wall Street, even when ..." and then stops.

Wholly embarrassed and humiliated, Mr. Kirby and Mrs. Kirby order Tony home with them immediately but Tony refuses to go. Alice finally decides that their marriage will never work and ends their engagement, and also decides to resign her job at Kirby's company. Before the Kirbys can leave, Department of Justice agents come through the door. The head agent tells them that Ed's pamphlets from the candy boxes, on which he has printed anything that "sounds nice", read "DYNAMITE THE CAPITOL", "DYNAMITE THE WHITE HOUSE", "DYNAMITE THE SUPREME COURT", and "GOD IS THE STATE, THE STATE IS GOD". Grandpa tries to explain to the head agent, but he informs them they are all under arrest.

The agents discover enormous amounts of gunpowder in the basement and think it is for dynamiting Washington, and one agent returns from the basement dragging Mr. De Pinna with him, who was in the basement the whole time. De Pinna desperately tries to explain to the agent that he had left his lit pipe downstairs and must go and get it, but the agent disregards him. Meanwhile, another agent brings down Gay Wellington from upstairs, singing drunkenly. At that point, the fireworks in the basement go off, lit by De Pinna's untended pipe, and everyone (aside from Grandpa and Wellington) panics, leaving the whole house in an uproar as Act II ends.

Act Three 
The next day, Donald and Rheba sit in the kitchen reading the paper, which focuses on the story of both families being arrested, with Mr. Kirby's presence causing the story to make headlines. Also, Paul and Mr. De Pinna's fireworks have been completely destroyed. Meanwhile, Alice has decided to leave for a prolonged trip to the Adirondack Mountains to think things over. When the family forgets to call for a cab, she finally shows her exasperation, angered that her family can't be "normal" at all. Tony then arrives and tries to reason with Alice, but she refuses, heading upstairs with Tony following.

Soon, Mr. Kolenkhov appears with the Grand Duchess Olga Katrina, in all of her former glory. After discussing the sad fate of former Russian royalty now working menial jobs in New York, the Grand Duchess soon insists upon going into the kitchen to cook the dinner for the family.

Mr. Kirby arrives to pick up Tony and to settle his score with Grandpa. Soon, Mr. Kirby and Tony get into a heated argument, the pinnacle of which finds Tony admitting that he had purposely brought his family on the wrong night, the night before. He explains that he wanted each family to see each other as they really were, and that he sees the Sycamores as "normal", that they are a family that loves and understands one another, saying that Mr. Kirby never had time to understand Tony. Grandpa tells Mr. Kirby that he's happy with no longer working and getting to enjoy life every day, and that has made him happy ever since, though Mr. Kirby is not convinced, especially as Grandpa suspects that Mr. Kirby doesn't like his job. Tony affirms this by pointing out that he found letters that Mr. Kirby had written to his father, expressing desires to be a trapeze artist and later a saxophone player, and that Mr. Kirby still has a saxophone in his closet. Grandpa tells Mr. Kirby that he should get to enjoy his life and riches now while he can, pointing out, "you can't take it with you". Tony agrees with this, deciding to leave the family business to do something he wants to do, and Mr. Kirby finally gives in, giving his blessings to Alice and Tony getting back together, which they do.

Essie then brings a letter to Grandpa that's from the government. Grandpa had lied to the government that he was actually Martin Vanderhof Jr., and that the Martin Vanderhof the government was looking for was his father. This is corroborated because the family had buried the deceased milkman (who had lived with them prior to De Pinna) using Grandpa's name, since they never knew the milkman's real name. Grandpa's trick works, as the government tells him that they now owe him a refund, instead of him owing them taxes.

The play comes to a conclusion as the family, along with Tony and Mr. Kirby, sit down to dinner with the Grand Duchess. Grandpa says a touching prayer, and then they dive into the food.

Characters 
 Penelope Sycamore Usually goes by Penny, Penelope is the mother of Essie and Alice, wife of Paul, and daughter of Martin. She writes plays and paints as hobbies because it makes her happy, but is terrible at both. Penny is a loving mother and wife who is constantly concerned with the welfare of her family. Her main goal is to make sure everyone is happy, particularly her daughter Alice. She is a main character.
 Essie Carmichael Wife of Ed, daughter of Penny and Paul Sycamore, Granddaughter of Martin, sister of Alice. She is childlike. As a hobby she makes candy that Ed sells. Essie dreams of being a ballerina. She has spent 8 years studying with Boris Kolenkhov, but is a terrible dancer.
 Rheba The African-American maid and cook to the Sycamore family. She is treated almost like a part of the family. She is dating Donald. In the words of Mrs. Sycamore, "The two of them are really cute together, something like Porgy and Bess."
 Paul Sycamore Father of Essie and Alice, husband of Penny, son-in-law of Martin. He is a tinkerer who manufactures fireworks in the basement with the help of his assistant Mr. De Pinna. His hobby is playing with erector sets.
 Mr. De Pinna The ice man who came inside to speak to Paul eight years before, and never left. He helps Mr. Sycamore build fireworks, and moonlights as a model in Mrs. Sycamore's paintings. 
 Ed Carmichael Husband of Essie, son-in-law of Paul and Penny. He is a xylophone player, and distributes Essie's candies. Ed is an amateur printer who prints anything that sounds 'catchy' to him. He prints up dinner menus for his family and communist pamphlets that he places in the boxes of Essie's candy. He also likes to make masks.
 Donald The African-American boyfriend of Rheba, who seems to serve as volunteer handyman for the Sycamores.
 Martin Vanderhof Referred to mostly as Grandpa in the play. Father-in-law to Paul, father of Penny, grandfather of Alice and Essie. He is an eccentric happy old man who has never paid his income tax because he doesn't believe in it, as he feels that the government wouldn't know what to do with the money if he paid it. Once a very successful businessman, he left his job 35 years prior for no reason other than to just relax. He lives his life by the philosophy "don't do anything that you're not going to enjoy doing". He goes to circuses, commencements, throws darts, and collects stamps. He is a main character.
 Alice Sycamore Fiancée of Tony Kirby, daughter of Paul and Penny, granddaughter of Martin, sister of Essie. She is the only "normal" member of the extended family. She has an office job, and is rather embarrassed by the eccentricities of her family when she has Tony and his parents at her house, yet she still loves them. She tends to be a pessimist.
 Wilbur C. Henderson An employee of the IRS. He comes to collect the tax money owed by Grandpa, and can't understand why the latter won't pay income tax.
 Tony Kirby Fiancé of Alice, son of Mr. and Mrs. Kirby. He sees how, even though the Sycamores appear odd, they are really the perfect family because they love and care about each other. His own family is very proper and has many issues none of them will admit. He is vice president of Kirby and Co. 
 Boris Kolenkhov A Russian who escaped to America shortly before the Russian Revolution. He is very concerned with world politics, and the deterioration of Russia. He is the ballet instructor of Essie, aware that she is untalented at dancing, but knows that she enjoys dancing so he keeps working with her. He admires the ancient Greeks and the Romans, questions society, and is interested in world affairs.
 Gay Wellington An actress whom Mrs. Sycamore meets on a bus and invites home to read one of her plays. She is an alcoholic, gets very drunk, and passes out shortly after arriving at the Sycamore's home.
 Anthony W. Kirby Husband of Mrs. Kirby, father of Tony. He is a very proper man who is president of Kirby and Co. and secretly despises his job. His hobby is raising expensive orchids. He is also a member of the Harvard Society, the Union Club, the National Geographic Society, and the Racquet Club.
 Miriam Kirby Wife of Mr. Kirby, mother of Tony. She is an extremely prim and proper woman and is horrified by the goings-on in the Sycamore household. Her hobby is spiritualism.
 G-Man 1 (The Man), G-Man 2 (Jim), G-Man 3 (Mac) Three agents who come to investigate Ed because of the communist origin of some of the 'catchy' quotes he printed and placed in Essie's candy boxes, such as "God is the State – the State is God" and  "Dynamite the White House".
 The Grand Duchess Olga Katrina She was one of the Grand Duchesses of Russia before the Revolution, another being her sister, the Grand Duchess Natasha. Since then she has been forced to flee to America where she has found work as a waitress in Childs Restaurant. The rest of her family has had a similar fate, such as her Uncle Sergei, the Grand Duke, who is now an elevator operator. She loves to cook as a hobby.

Productions
The play premiered on Broadway at the Booth Theatre on December 14, 1936, and ran there until September 3, 1938; it transferred to the Imperial Theatre, running from September 5, 1938, to October 29, 1938, and finally transferred to the Ambassador Theatre from October 31, 1938, to December 3, 1938, for a total of 838 performances. George S. Kaufman was the director.

The play was revived on Broadway with a production opening at the 
Plymouth Theatre on April 4, 1983, to December 10, 1983, and transferring to the Royale Theatre from December 13, 1983, to January 1, 1984, for a total of 312 performances. Directed by Ellis Rabb, the cast starred Jason Robards as Martin Vanderhof, Colleen Dewhurst as Olga, James Coco as Boris Kolenkhov and Elizabeth Wilson as Penelope Sycamore.

A 1985 revival starred Eddie Albert as Grandpa Vanderhof, Eva Gabor as Grand Duchess Olga Katrina and Jack Dodson as Paul Sycamore.

A two-act version was staged at the Royal Exchange Theatre Manchester from December 2011 to January 2012. It received excellent reviews and played to packed houses throughout.

A revival opened on Broadway at the Longacre Theater on August 26, 2014 (previews) and on September 28, 2014 (officially). Directed by Scott Ellis, the cast starred James Earl Jones as Martin Vanderhof, Rose Byrne as Alice Sycamore, Elizabeth Ashley as The Grand Duchess Olga, Annaleigh Ashford as Essie Carmichael (a role which earned her a Tony Award for Featured Actress in a Musical), Johanna Day as Mrs. Kirby, Julie Halston as Gay Wellington, Byron Jennings as Mr. Kirby, Mark Linn-Baker as Paul Sycamore, Crystal Dickinson as Rheba, Patrick Kerr as Mr. De Pinna, Will Brill as Ed, Marc Damon Johnson as Donald, Reg Rogers as Boris Kolenkhov, Fran Kranz as Tony Kirby, Kristine Nielsen as Penelope Sycamore, Karl Kenzler as Henderson, and the G-Men played by Nick Corley, Austin Durant, and Joe Tapper. Understudies include Corley, Barrett Doss, Durant, Ned Noyes, Pippa Pearthree, Tapper, and Charles Turner.

Film and TV adaptations

The play was the basis for the 1938 film directed by Frank Capra. The film cast included James Stewart, Jean Arthur, Lionel Barrymore, Edward Arnold, Spring Byington, Ann Miller, Dub Taylor, Charles Lane, Mischa Auer, Eddie 'Rochester' Anderson, and the uncredited Arthur Murray.  It was awarded the Academy Award for Best Picture and Best Director of 1938.  The film version has the same overall plot and themes as the play but includes new scenes, dialogue, and slightly different characterizations, such as a side plot about Kirby Sr.'s attempt to acquire the Vanderhof house for a real estate development, and removed the side plot of Grand Duchess Olga Katrina.

CBS produced a notable television adaptation of the original play in 1979.  It featured Art Carney as Grandpa, along with Jean Stapleton, Beth Howland, Blythe Danner, Robert Mandan, Harry Morgan, Barry Bostwick, Kenneth Mars, Howard Hesseman and Polly Holliday. A second television adaptation was produced in 1984 by Public Broadcasting Service. This version, featuring Jason Robards as Grandpa was based on the Broadway revival and filmed at Royale Theatre, New York City and was included in Great Performances (November 21, 1984).

A syndicated situation comedy based on the play, produced by NBC, ran in the United States during the 1987–1988 season. Harry Morgan, who had played Mr. De Pinna in the 1979 telefilm, appeared in the series as Grandpa.

References

Further reading

External links

 
 
 
 Review by Brooks Atkinson of the original production
1946 Theatre Guild on the Air radio adaptation at Internet Archive

1937 plays
Plays by George S. Kaufman
Plays by Moss Hart
Broadway plays
Pulitzer Prize for Drama-winning works
Comedy plays
Plays adapted into television shows
American plays adapted into films
Plays set in New York City
Plays set in the 1930s

es:You Can't Take It With You